New Labour Identity (NIdiL) is a trade union representing freelance workers and those on zero hours contracts in Italy.

The union was established in 1998 as part of the Italian General Confederation of Labour.  While representing all precarious workers, many of its members are young workers.  It campaigns for improved rights for its members, and for their access to credit and benefits such as pensions.  It was prominent in highlighting the difficulties many precarious workers faced during the COVID-19 pandemic.

General Secretaries
1998: Cesare Minghini
2001: Emilio Viafora
2006: Filomena Trizio
2013: Claudio Treves
2018: Andrea Borghesi

External links

References

Precarious workers' trade unions
Trade unions established in 1998
Trade unions in Italy